Taran Mackenzie Alvelo (born June 14, 1996) is an American softball player for the Chicago Bandits. She attended Bloom-Carroll High School in Carroll, Ohio. She later attended the University of Washington, where she was an All-American pitcher for the Washington Huskies softball team. Alvelo led the Huskies to back-to-back-to-back Women's College World Series appearances in 2017, 2018, and 2019. She represented Puerto Rico at the World Cup of Softball, playing on the Puerto Rico women's national softball team.

University of Washington 
Alvelo made her collegiate debut for Washington on Feb. 12, 2016, throwing a complete game in a 10-3 shutout of No. 9 Oklahoma. She finished her freshman season with an 18-7 record, leading the Huskies in starts, complete games, innings pitched, and strikeouts, despite missing the final two series of the regular season with an ankle injury. Following the season she was named Pac-12 Freshman of the Year. She returned on the final day of the 2016 Seattle Regional against No. 12 Minnesota, then appeared in both games of the Tuscaloosa Super Regional as the Huskies were knocked out in two games by Alabama.

As the Huskies' No. 1 starter in 2017, Alvelo led the Pac-12 with 254.0 innings pitched, and her 35 wins are fourth-most in Washington history. She opened the 2017 season with a 10-inning complete game, allowing one run on four hits as the No. 13 Huskies upset No. 2 Auburn at the Puerto Vallarta College Challenge. Two days later, she threw a complete-game shutout against No. 1 Oklahoma. The weekend earned her NFCA Pitcher of the Week, ESPNW Pitcher of the Week, and the first of three Pac-12 Pitcher of the Week honors that season.

Alvelo threw her first collegiate no-hitter against Montana on May 19, 2017 in Washington's first game of the Seattle Regional and went on to throw 55 innings in 10 postseason games.

As a junior, Alvelo threw 31.1 scoreless innings to open the 2018 season, not allowing a run threw her first five outings. As the season went on, Alvelo began to split pitching duties more and more with freshman Gabbie Plain, and an injury to her ribs limited Alvelo in May. She only made one appearance in each of the Huskies' final two regular-season series, and only threw three innings at the 2018 Seattle Regional. After Plain pitched the first game of the 2018 Seattle Super Regional against No. 12 Alabama, Alvelo got the start in Game 2, striking out eight in a 94-pitch shutout.

Alvelo came out of the bullpen in Washington's first two games at the 2018 Women's College World Series, before taking the ball to start against No. 4 Oklahoma. Throwing another complete-game shutout, she struck out six Sooners to send the Huskies to the National Championship. Alvelo started Game 2 of the championship series, allowing seven runs in 3.1 innings and taking the loss as Florida State won its first Women's College World Series.

Coming into her senior season, Alvelo ranked seventh all-time in UW history with 595 strikeouts. In 16 nonconference appearances, she racked up 118 more, compiling a 1.11 ERA. Washington opened up conference play against No. 1 UCLA, with Plain coming off of two straight no-hitters. Alvelo came out of the bullpen in the Friday night game and took the loss, allowing a three-run double in the sixth inning of a 3-0 loss. Two days later, Alvelo gave up 15 runs on 15 hits in a loss.

Following the UCLA series, Alvelo bounced back. In her final 17 appearances of the regular season, she went 13-0 with a 0.75 ERA and 114 strikeouts.

With the Huskies making their third straight trip to the WCWS, Alvelo started their first game and took the loss in a complete game against Arizona. She came out of the bullpen with two outs in the bottom of the seventh inning and the tying run on second against Minnesota, getting a strikeout to keep the Huskies' season alive. Later that day, Alvelo started against Oklahoma State and struck out 16 in a 1-0 shutout, the most by a UW pitcher at the WCWS. In Washington's 10-inning loss to UCLA in the semifinals, Alvelo threw three innings of relief before giving Plain the ball back. With the final pitch of her collegiate career, she struck out Kinsley Washington looking for her 895th career strikeout, passing Jennifer Spediacci for second all-time in UW history.

Professional career
On April 16, 2019, Alvelo was selected eighth overall in the 2019 NPF Draft by the Aussie Peppers of the National Pro Fastpitch league. In her rookie season, she put up a 7-1 record and a 1.38 ERA in 45.2 innings pitched.

On Jan. 15, 2020, Alvelo signed with the Chicago Bandits.

Statistics

Washington Huskies

USSSA Pride

References

External links
 
Washington bio

1996 births
Softball players from Ohio
Puerto Rican softball players
Living people
People from Fairfield County, Ohio
USSSA Pride players
Washington Huskies softball players
Pan American Games medalists in softball
Pan American Games bronze medalists for Puerto Rico
Softball players at the 2019 Pan American Games
Medalists at the 2019 Pan American Games